ABC South East may refer to either of these two Australian Broadcasting Corporation radio stations:

ABC South East NSW
ABC South East SA